Identification or identify may refer to:

Identity document, any document used to verify a person's identity

Arts, entertainment and media
Identify (album) by Got7, 2014
"Identify" (song), by Natalie Imbruglia, 1999
Identification (album), by Benjamin Ingrosso, 2018
 Station identification, or ident, radio or TV stations identifying themselves on-air
Kill Command, also known as Identify, a 2016 film

Science and technology
 Identification (information), for data storage
 Identifiability, in statistics
 Identification (biology), assigning a taxon to an individual organism
 Identification scheme, in metadata, used to identify unique records in a set

Social sciences
 Identification (psychology), a concept in psychoanalysis
 Identification in rhetoric, a rhetorical theory of persuasion
 Identification (literature), the audience identifying with a character, or a narrative device

See also

 
 
 Human identification (disambiguation)
 Identification tag (disambiguation)
 Identity (disambiguation)
 ID (disambiguation)
 Animal identification, identifying and tracking specific animals
 Biometrics, body measurements and calculations related to human characteristics
 Body identification, in forensic science
 Eyewitness identification, in criminal law
 Forensic identification, the application of forensic science
 Gender identity, a person's sense of gender
 Identification friend or foe, an identification system designed for command and control
 Language identification, in natural language processing
 Particle identification, in experimental physics
 Programme identification, provided by radio stations 
 System identification, building mathematical models of dynamical systems from measured data
 Wikipedia:Identification, a Wikipedia project page